Philyra is a plant genus of the family Euphorbiaceae first described as a genus in 1841. It contains only one known species, Philyra brasiliensis, native to Brazil, Paraguay, and northeastern Argentina.

References

Chrozophoreae
Flora of South America
Taxa named by Johann Friedrich Klotzsch